The Schreder HP-19 is an American, high-wing, T-tail, single seat glider designed by Richard Schreder.

Design and development
The HP-19 was another Schreder design for the FAI 15 Metre Class. The HP-19 drawings were just complete when the designer lost interest in development and turned his attention to the HP-21 instead. The sole example of the HP-19 was built by Henry Preiss in Schreder's workshop in Bryan, Ohio and first flew in 1981.

The HP-19 is built from metal and fiberglass and features carbon fiber spar caps, along with foam ribs. The wing is straight, tapered and has winglets, along with the trademark Schreder 90° flaps. The airfoil is a Schreder modification of a Wortmann section.  of water ballast can be carried. The landing gear is a retractable monowheel.

Variants
HP-19C
The sole example of the HP-19 is registered as an HP-19C.

Specifications (HP-19)

See also

References

1980s United States sailplanes
Schreder aircraft
Aircraft first flown in 1981